The 1998 NCAA Skiing Championships were contested at the Bridger Bowl Ski Area in Bozeman, Montana as part of the 45th annual NCAA-sanctioned ski tournament to determine the individual and team national champions of men's and women's collegiate slalom and cross-country skiing in the United States.

Colorado, coached by Richard Rokos, won the team championship, the Buffaloes' fourteenth title overall and third as a co-ed team.

Venue

This year's NCAA skiing championships were hosted at the Bridger Bowl Ski Area near Bozeman, Montana.

These were the fifth championships held in the state of Montana (1960, 1983, 1985, 1996, and 1998).

Program

Men's events
 Cross country, 20 kilometer freestyle
 Cross country, 10 kilometer classical
 Slalom
 Giant slalom

Women's events
 Cross country, 15 kilometer freestyle
 Cross country, 5 kilometer classical
 Slalom
 Giant slalom

Team scoring

 DC – Defending champions
 Debut team appearance

See also
 List of NCAA skiing programs

References

1998 in sports in Montana
NCAA Skiing Championships
NCAA Skiing Championships
1998 in alpine skiing
1998 in cross-country skiing